Mohamed El-Kamaa is a Libyan former cyclist. He competed in the team time trial event at the 1980 Summer Olympics.

References

External links
 

1958 births
Living people
Libyan male cyclists
Olympic cyclists of Libya
Cyclists at the 1980 Summer Olympics
Place of birth missing (living people)